Muhammad Saleh Shah (Urdu: محمد صالح شاہ) is a Pakistani Politician and Member of Senate of Pakistan, currently serving as Chairperson- Senate Committee on States and Frontier Regions.

Political career
He belongs to FATA region of Pakistan, and was elected to the Senate of Pakistan in March 2012 on a general seat from FATA as Independent candidate. He is the chairperson of Senate Committee on States and Frontier Regions and member of senate committees of Religious Affairs and Interfaith Harmony, Housing and Works, Planning Development and Reform. He had been a senator previously from 2006 to 2012.

See also
 List of Senators of Pakistan
 List of committees of the Senate of Pakistan

References

External links
Senate of Pakistan Official Website

Living people
Pakistani senators (14th Parliament)
Year of birth missing (living people)